Earl of Glasgow is a title in the Peerage of Scotland. It was created in 1703 for David Boyle, Lord Boyle.

The first earl was subsequently one of the commissioners who negotiated the Treaty of Union uniting the Kingdom of England and the Kingdom of Scotland into the Kingdom of Great Britain. He had already been created Lord Boyle of Kelburn, Stewartoun, Cumbrae, Finnick, Largs and Dalry in 1699, and was made Lord Boyle of Stewartoun, Cumbraes, Fenwick, Largs and Dalry and Viscount Kelburn at the same time as he was granted the earldom. These titles are also in the Peerage of Scotland.

The fourth Earl was in 1815 created Baron Ross, of Hawkhead in the County of Renfrew, in the Peerage of the United Kingdom, a title which became extinct on the death of the sixth Earl in 1890. The seventh Earl served as Governor of New Zealand from 1892 to 1897 and was created Baron Fairlie, of Fairlie in the County of Ayr, in the Peerage of the United Kingdom, in 1897.

Brigadier Bernard Fergusson, Baron Ballantrae, and journalist Sir James Fergusson, 8th Baronet, were both grandsons of the 7th Earl.

The Earl of Glasgow is the hereditary Clan Chief of Clan Boyle.

The family seat is Kelburn Castle in Ayrshire, Scotland.

Earls of Glasgow (1703)
David Boyle, 1st Earl of Glasgow (1666–1733)
John Boyle, 2nd Earl of Glasgow (1688–1740)
John Boyle, 3rd Earl of Glasgow (1714–1775)
George Boyle, 4th Earl of Glasgow (1766–1843)
John Boyle, Lord Boyle (1789–1818)
James Carr-Boyle, 5th Earl of Glasgow (1792–1869)
George Frederick Boyle, 6th Earl of Glasgow (1825–1890)
David Boyle, 7th Earl of Glasgow (1833–1915)
Patrick James Boyle, 8th Earl of Glasgow (1874–1963)
David William Maurice Boyle, 9th Earl of Glasgow (1910–1984)
Patrick Robin Archibald Boyle, 10th Earl of Glasgow (born 1939)

The heir apparent is the present holder's son, David Michael Douglas Boyle, Viscount Kelburn (born 1978).

Male-line family tree

See also
Clan Boyle

References

Sources
 
 

Earldoms in the Peerage of Scotland
1703 establishments in Scotland
Earl
Noble titles created in 1703